Pedro Mejías is a Venezuelan freestyle wrestler. He is a two-time gold medalist at the South American Games and a bronze medalist at the Pan American Games. He is also a two-time medalist at the Central American and Caribbean Games and a four-time medalist at the Pan American Wrestling Championships.

Career 

In 2019, he competed in the 57 kg event at the Pan American Games held in Lima, Peru without winning a medal; he was eliminated in his first match by Reineri Andreu of Cuba.

In March 2020, he won the silver medal in the 57 kg event at the 2020 Pan American Wrestling Championships held in Ottawa, Canada. He also competed in the 2020 Pan American Wrestling Olympic Qualification Tournament, also held in Ottawa, Canada, without qualifying for the 2020 Summer Olympics in Tokyo, Japan. He also failed to qualify for the Olympics at the World Olympic Qualification Tournament held in Sofia, Bulgaria.

He won the silver medal in his event at the 2022 South American Games held in Asunción, Paraguay.

Achievements

References

External links 
 

Living people
Year of birth missing (living people)
Place of birth missing (living people)
Venezuelan male sport wrestlers
South American Games medalists in wrestling
South American Games gold medalists for Venezuela
South American Games silver medalists for Venezuela
Competitors at the 2014 South American Games
Competitors at the 2018 South American Games
Competitors at the 2022 South American Games
Pan American Wrestling Championships medalists
Pan American Games bronze medalists for Venezuela
Pan American Games competitors for Venezuela
Pan American Games medalists in wrestling
Medalists at the 2015 Pan American Games
Wrestlers at the 2015 Pan American Games
Wrestlers at the 2019 Pan American Games
Central American and Caribbean Games bronze medalists for Venezuela
Central American and Caribbean Games medalists in wrestling
Competitors at the 2014 Central American and Caribbean Games
Competitors at the 2018 Central American and Caribbean Games
21st-century Venezuelan people